The following is a list of winners of the Golden Calf for best Sound Design at the Nederlands Film Festival (NFF). This category has been awarded since 2003.

 2003 Herman Pieëte - Phileine Zegt Sorry
 2004 Georges Bossaers - De Passievrucht
 2005 Bart Jilesen - Zwarte Zwanen
 2006 Peter Flamman & his team - Ik Omhels Je Met 1000 Armen
 2007 Mark Glynne, Kees de Groot, Joost Roskam en Pepijn Aben - Tussenstand
 2008 Huibert Boon, Alex Booy & Robil Rahantoeknam - Winterstilte
 2009 Jan Schermer - Nothing Personal
 2010 Peter Warnier - R U There
 2011 Jan Schermer - Code Blue
 2012 Bert Rijkelijkhuizen - The Girl and Death
 2013 Peter Warnier - De wederopstanding van een klootzak
 2014 Wart Wamsteker - De Poel
 2015 Vincent Sinceretti & Taco Drijfhout - Those Who Feel the Fire Burning
 2016 Mark Glynne - Beyond Sleep
 2017 Herman Pieëte - Brimstone
 2018 Jan Schermer - Beyond Words
 2019 Alex Booy & Huibert Boon - My Foolish Heart
 2020 Marco Vermaas - Bumperkleef
 2021 Herman Pieëte - The Forgotten Battle
 2022 Evelien van der Molen - Captain Nova

Sources
 Golden Calf Awards (Dutch)
 NFF Website

Best Sound Design